Nemeskisfalud is a village in Somogy county, Hungary.

Notable residents
 József Madarász (1814 – 1915), Hungarian lawyer, politician

External links 
 Street map (Hungarian)

References 

Populated places in Somogy County